Mordellistena cuneigera is a beetle in the genus Mordellistena of the family Mordellidae. It was described in 1922 by George Charles Champion.

References

cuneigera
Beetles described in 1922